Asbjørn Ruud (6 October 1919 – 26 March 1989) was a Norwegian ski jumper. Together with his brothers Birger and Sigmund he dominated international ski jumping in the 1930s. Ruud won a gold medal at the 1938 FIS Nordic World Ski Championships. Eight years later, he won the ski jumping competition at the Holmenkollen ski festival, the first held since the German occupation of Norway in 1940 during World War II. At the 1948 Winter Olympics in St. Moritz, Ruud finished seventh in the individual large hill competition. For his ski jumping effort, he earned the Holmenkollen medal in 1948, the second of the three Ruud brothers to do so.

References

External links

 – click Holmenkollmedaljen for downloadable pdf file 
 – click Vinnere for downloadable pdf file 

1919 births
1989 deaths
Ski jumpers at the 1948 Winter Olympics
Holmenkollen medalists
Holmenkollen Ski Festival winners
Norwegian male ski jumpers
Olympic ski jumpers of Norway
FIS Nordic World Ski Championships medalists in ski jumping
Kongsberg IF ski jumpers
People from Kongsberg
Sportspeople from Viken (county)
20th-century Norwegian people